The 2020 TCR Malaysia Touring Car Championship was the second season of the TCR Malaysia Touring Car Championship. A three-round season will be held at Sepang International Circuit from 18 January to 1 March. Luca Engstler became the Drivers' champion with an equal number of points with Dan Lloyd, ahead of wins four to one.

Teams and drivers
Yokohama is the official tire supplier.

Calendar and results

The calendar was released on 25 July 2019 with all rounds being held within Malaysia.

Championship standings

Drivers' championship

Cup championship

Team's Standings

References 

TCR Malaysia Touring Car Championship
Malaysia Touring Car Championship